OJSC Dagestan Airlines was an airline based at Uytash Airport in Makhachkala, Dagestan, Russia, operating domestic and international scheduled and chartered flights.

History 
The roots of the airline can be traced back to February 1927, when an Aeroflot department serving the Makhachkala region of the Soviet Union was founded. In 1994, following the split-up of Aeroflot, it became and independent company known as Makhachkala Air Enterprise. In 1996, the company was rebranded as Dagestan Airlines. In March 2007, it had 809 employees.

From 2010 onwards, the South East Airlines branding was introduced. On 19 December 2011, the airline had its licence revoked but the airline said they would appeal the decision.

Destinations 

As of December 2010, Dagestan Airlines operated scheduled flights to the following destinations:

Russia
Makhachkala – Uytash Airport base
Moscow
Domodedovo International Airport
Vnukovo International Airport
Saint Petersburg – Pulkovo Airport
Turkey
Istanbul – Sabiha Gökçen International Airport
United Arab Emirates
Sharjah – Sharjah International Airport

Fleet 
The South East Airlines fleet consisted of the following aircraft (as of December 2011):

Accidents and incidents 
On 4 December 2010, Dagestan Airlines Flight 372, a Tupolev Tu-154M carrying 160 passengers and 8 crew, crashed during an emergency landing at Domodedovo International Airport, Moscow. Two passengers died and 56 were injured.

References

External links 

  

Defunct airlines of Russia
Companies based in Makhachkala
Airlines established in 1994
Airlines disestablished in 2011
Former Aeroflot divisions
1994 establishments in Russia